Enebyberg is a suburban area in Stockholm, Sweden and a part of Danderyd Municipality, Stockholm County. It was founded in the beginning of the 1900s and became a municipal community in 1914. Enebyberg later merged with Danderyd, Stocksund, and Djursholm to form Danderyd Municipality. Its location is very close to Täby Municipality,, therefore forming a part of its urban area. Swedish writer Jonas Gardell is from Enebyberg.

Metropolitan Stockholm